Breaza is a commune in Buzău County, Muntenia, Romania. It is composed of five villages: Bădeni, Breaza, Greceanca, Văleanca-Vilănești and Vispești.

Notes

Communes in Buzău County
Localities in Muntenia